The March 1917 tornado outbreak was a tornado outbreak that occurred on March 23, 1917. It affected the Ohio Valley and produced several strong tornadoes, the worst of which devastated the city of New Albany, Indiana.

Confirmed tornadoes

March event

See also
 List of North American tornadoes and tornado outbreaks

References

Bibliography

J
J
1917 natural disasters in the United States
March 1917 events